Van Hollen is a surname. Notable people with the name include:

Chris Van Hollen, American politician from Maryland 
Christopher Van Hollen (diplomat) (1922–2013), American Foreign Service officer
J. B. Van Hollen (born 1966), American lawyer, former Attorney General of Wisconsin
John C. Van Hollen (born 1933), American businessman and politician, former Wisconsin State Assembly member

See also
Van Halen (disambiguation)
Hollen, a village in Lower Saxony, Germany.